Pangkalan may refer to the following places:

Indonesia
Pangkalan Brandan, North Sumatra
Pangkalan Bun, Central Kalimantan
Pangkalan Kerinci, Riau

Malaysia
Pangkalan Stungkor, Lundu Division, Sarawak
Pangkalan Tebang, Kuching Division, Sarawak